"Sparrows" is a song performed by American contemporary worship musician Cory Asbury. On September 11, 2020, the song was released to Christian radio in the United States as the second single from Asbury's third studio album, To Love a Fool. Asbury collaborated with Ethan Hulse, Andrew Ripp, and Jared Anderson in writing the song, and the production of the single was handled by Paul Mabury.

"Sparrows" was a commercial success, having reached No. 6 on the US Hot Christian Songs chart while becoming Asbury's third top ten on the chart.

Background
On June 29, 2020, Asbury unveiled the name and artwork of the then-upcoming album, To Love a Fool, with the release date slated for July 31, 2020. Asbury held an election-style contest for the release of a song from the album, asking fans to vote between "Canyons" and "Sparrows", with the winning song being slated for release on July 10, 2020. The contest was set on July 2. "Sparrows" won the contest and was released as the first promotional single from the album, concurrently launching the album's pre-order. 

In an interview with Billboard, Asbury revealed that "Sparrows" will be the second single from the album, following "The Father's House". "Sparrows" was serviced to Christian radio on September 11, 2020, as the second official single from the album. On November 6, 2020, Asbury released the live version of "Sparrows" as part of his album,  To Love a Fool – A Rooftop Experience (2020).

Composition

Commercial performance
"Sparrows" debuted at number 48 on the US Hot Christian Songs chart dated August 1, 2020. The song debuted on the Christian Airplay chart dated September 19, 2020, at number 31, following its release to Christian radio.
On the Hot Christian Songs chart dated February 20, 2021, "Sparrows" also became his third top ten entry, having peaked at number 10.

Music videos
Asbury published the audio video of the song on YouTube on July 10, 2020. Asbury then released the acoustic performance video of the song, which was recorded in his loft in downtown Kalamazoo, Michigan, on July 13, 2020. On November 6, 2020, Asbury published the live performance video of the song, which was recorded on a rooftop in Kalamazoo, Michigan.

Charts

Weekly charts

Year-end charts

Release history

References

External links
  on PraiseCharts

2020 singles
2020 songs
Cory Asbury songs
Songs written by Andrew Ripp
Songs written by Ethan Hulse